The Ersatz Zenta class was a class of three planned light cruisers of the Austro-Hungarian Navy designed in the mid-1910s as part of a naval expansion program passed during a period of rising tensions in Europe. Several designs were proposed, including options for a so-called "yacht cruiser" that was to have been used by Archduke Franz Ferdinand, the heir to the Austro-Hungarian throne.

The Austro-Hungarian Navy followed the traditional German custom of not naming the new ships until they were formally launched. As a result, the Navy only referred to them as "replacements" for the s. The ships, only ever given the contract names "Cruiser K", "Cruiser L", and "Cruiser M", were scheduled to be laid down beginning in July 1914. The assassination of Archduke Franz Ferdinand the month before and the resulting July Crisis, which culminated in the start of World War I on 28 July, led the navy to suspend all new ship construction projects. Work on a revised version of the design began in December 1915, but shortages of material and a lack of skilled shipyard workers meant that the new design would be completed on paper only. None of the three ships were ever laid down and the project was abandoned after Austria-Hungary's defeat at the end of the war.

Background
The Ersatz Zenta-class cruisers were intended to be constructed at a time when Austro-Hungary was engaged in a naval arms race with its nominal ally, Italy. Italy's Regia Marina was considered the most-important naval power in the region which Austria-Hungary measured itself against, often unfavorably. In 1909, the Austro-Hungarian Navy had 9 cruisers of various types in commission, while Italy had 14. The disparity between the two navies was even greater when taking into account tonnage. This gave Italy a more than two to one advantage among cruisers.

Proposals
The Bosnian Crisis of 1908, the Italo-Turkish War of 1911–1912 and the Balkan Wars of 1912–1913 significantly increased tensions in Europe, which saw the dismemberment of large swaths of the Ottoman Empire. These conflicts provided the background for a major naval expansion program in Austria-Hungary, which received broad support in the Austrian and Hungarian parliaments. Admiral Anton Haus, then the Commanders-in-Chief of the Navy (German: Marinekommandant) used the growing risk of war with Austria-Hungary's nominal ally, Italy, to push his construction program. On 5 October 1913, Haus presented a new five-year construction program which called for four superdreadnoughts to replace the aging s, as well as three scout cruisers, six destroyers, two river monitors, and one supply ship. The scout cruisers in this plan would eventually form the design of the Ersatz Zenta-class cruiser. Haus estimated the cost of this program to be over 420 million krone. As part of its construction program, the navy projected to build three cruisers, and adopted a secret construction schedule on 12 January 1914, which called for the first vessel to be laid down on 1 July 1914, followed by the other two on 1 July 1915. The first ship was projected to be completed by 31 December 1917, with the second and third following on 31 December 1918. By 1919, all three ships were expected to be complete and commissioned into the Austro-Hungarian Navy.

The Ersatz Zenta-class cruisers were intended to play a diverse role in Austro-Hungarian naval policy. The remaining Ersatz Zenta-class cruiser would be a part of the Reserve Squadron, which was to be made up of the s, the s, the s, six s, and 12 s. Each ship in the class was designated to replace an existing cruiser from the older Zenta class. "Cruiser K" was intended to replace , "Cruiser L" would replace , and "Cruiser M" was to replace .

Preliminary design work on what became the Ersatz Zenta class began in May 1913, before the budgetary debate had begun. The ship would carry no armor protection, and the armament would consist of either twelve  45-caliber (cal.) guns and two  anti-aircraft guns all singly mounted, or fourteen of the 12 cm guns and four  torpedo tubes in single or double mounts.

During the design process, Archduke Franz Ferdinand of Austria, the heir to the Austro-Hungarian throne, requested that one of the new cruisers be built as a "yacht cruiser". The designers considered two options to accommodate Ferdinand's request, the first with a deck house on the stern in place of some of the guns; in the event of war, the deck house could be removed and the guns installed, and the second wherein the ship would not be readily converted and would only be used for auxiliary roles during a conflict. In either case, the maximum speed for the so-called "yacht cruiser" was to be , with no armor protection, and it was to resemble the other two ships as closely as possible.

On 12 September 1913, the navy began the design competition, soliciting offers from several different shipyards. The designer of the winning bid was to receive a prize of 2,450 krone and the runner-up would receive 1,750 krone. Franz Pitzinger, the chief constructor of the Austro-Hungarian navy, was occupied with the design of the Ersatz Monarch-class battleship, allowing one of the private firms an opportunity to design the new class of cruisers. Two naval engineers, Silvius Morin of the MTK and Johann Fiala, who oversaw the construction of the cruiser Admiral Spaun at the Pola Naval Arsenal, submitted the two most serious proposals. Fiala submitted two variants, Ia and IIb, along with a third for the "yacht cruiser" that was considered separately during the design competition. His third design, Ic, was identical in dimensions to the other two proposals, though it incorporated an armored belt of  Krupp cemented steel. While busy with the Ersatz Monarch project, Pitzinger nevertheless submitted a design by the deadline.

Designs

Selection and approval
On 14 April 1914, the navy ruled out Morin's design. Fiala's Ib design was the version chosen, though the navy requested several alterations. A four-shaft arrangement was also proposed as a possibility. The changes requested by the navy evidenced an evolution in Austro-Hungarian cruiser designs away from the unarmored scout cruisers of the earlier Admiral Spaun and Novara types toward modern light cruisers suited to fleet operations.

Funding for the three cruisers were approved on 18 April 1914 as part of Haus' 1915–1919 naval construction program. It was scheduled to come into force on 1 July. The entire project, which called for four battleships, three cruisers, and six destroyers, had a final cost of 426.8–427.8 million krone. On 16 May, the navy informed the shipbuilding firms Stabilimento Tecnico Triestino (STT), Ganz-Danubius, CNT Monfalcone, and San Rocco AG to submit tenders to build the ships, with a deadline of 5 July. At the same time, Fiala issued a request for a  propulsion system to STT, Ganz-Danubius, and Breitfeld & Danek. On 28 May, the navy secured approval for constructing the three cruisers. On 2 August, days after the outbreak of World War I, the navy awarded Ganz-Danubius with the contract to build the three cruisers. It had settled on a two-shaft arrangement with AEG-Curtis turbines license-built by Ganz—Danubius.

The "yacht cruiser" project was handled separately by the navy; Morin's design was again ruled out, now because he had focused his design too much on the yacht aspect of the vessel, neglecting its military qualities. Again, the navy chose Fiala's proposal, named IIb, as the basis for the "yacht cruiser", citing its heavier armament and higher speed, compared to Morin's vessel. But no final design had been approved by the time Franz Ferdinand was assassinated in Sarajevo on 28 June 1914; with the death of the man who had requested the "yacht cruiser", the navy no longer had a reason to pursue the project.

Characteristics
Their beam was to have been .

Steam was provided by sixteen Yarrow boilers, eight of which were to burn coal and the other eight to burn fuel oil. Top speed was to have been . Fuel storage capacity and thus cruising range are unknown.

The ships retained the fourteen 12 cm 45-cal. guns of Fiala's design, and received a  44-cal. gun and a  18-cal. landing gun in addition. The 12 cm guns had reached the prototype stage only by the outbreak of World War I saw the ships' cancellation, so no performance data exists. A longer-barreled 50-cal. version was also prepared for possible use aboard the Ersatz Zenta class, but it too did not see completion. They were also to carry a pair of  torpedo tubes in deck-mounted launchers, which were placed amidships.

Ships

Construction and cancellation
Each ship in the class, referred to in the budget as "Cruiser K", "Cruiser L", and "Cruiser M", was to cost 15.45 million krone and be constructed within 30 months. "Cruiser K" was expected to be laid down on 1 July 1914, followed by "Cruiser L" and "Cruiser M" on 1 July 1915. "Cruiser K"s expected completion date was listed 31 December 1916 in the budget, while "Cruiser L" and "Cruiser M" were both expected to be finished on 31 December 1917. All three ships were to have completed their sea trials and been commissioned into the Austro-Hungarian Navy by 1919. With the assassination of Archduke Franz Ferdinand on 28 June 1914 however, construction on the first ship was halted just days before its hull was scheduled to be laid down. With the outbreak of World War I on 28 July, construction never began on the three cruisers. Indeed, the navy refused to use part of the war appropriations passed under the naval expansion budget to fund construction of the vessels, preferring to await the end of what was expected to be a short war, and then use the additional wartime funds to build improved ships. The navy mistakenly assumed no new projects could be completed before the war would be over, and any wartime experience would necessarily have to be incorporated in any future design.

In August 1914, the Austro-Hungarian government suspended all contracts which had been awarded as part of Haus' naval program, including the three ships of the Ersatz Zenta class. In October 1914, the Hungarian finance ministry attempted to cancel the projects outright. While the navy was unwilling to begin work on the ships until after the war, Haus objected to a cancellation of the project and in February 1915 a compromise was reached where construction would be halted until after the war, but the project would be suspended, not formally canceled.

While Fiala remained at STT, he continued to refine the design. On 14 May 1915, nine days before Italy declared war on Austria-Hungary, Fiala was recalled to the MTK. He continued to independently work on the cruiser project as late as 14 December that year. On 25 December, he was officially ordered to prepare a revised design with the following characteristics: armament was to be increased to two  45-cal. guns in a twin gun turret, supported by six to eight  50-cal. guns in single mounts and two  45-cal. anti-aircraft guns; the 533 mm torpedo tubes would be retained. Speed was to be 29 to 30 knots, with a cruising radius sufficient to allow operations in the Mediterranean Sea.

The new project was simply a design study only, since the majority of the shipyard workers had already been drafted into the Austro-Hungarian Army and material shortages prevented any actual work from being done anyway. It nevertheless represented the lessons learned from the first year of the war, including the fact that the 12 cm guns used on earlier Austro-Hungarian cruisers was wholly insufficient, as exemplified by the loss of the German cruiser  to the  gun armed  in 1914. The lack of shipyard workers was itself a result of the navy's decision at the start of the war to stop new construction; since the shipyards no longer needed large work forces, those men could be used in the army.

Notes

Footnotes

Citations

References
 
 
 
  
 
 
 

Cancelled ships
Cruisers of the Austro-Hungarian Navy